The Naval War College Foundation was established in 1969 and chartered under the tax laws of the United States as a non-profit 501(c)(3) charitable corporation in the state of Rhode Island to provide private financial support for the activities of the United States Naval War College.

History
The establishment of the Naval War College Foundation was an initiative of Vice Admiral Richard G. Colbert during his term as President of the Naval War College. In 1969, on Colbert's recommendation, Secretary of the Navy John H. Chafee approved the establishment of the Foundation and it was chartered in the State of Rhode Island. John Nicholas Brown, a prominent Rhode Island philanthropist and a former Assistant Secretary of the Navy for Air, became the Foundation's first president and Rear Admiral Richard W. Bates, who had been long served on the Naval War College faculty, became its first executive director.  By its charter, the Foundation could support activities and projects which the President of the Naval War College approved to carry that would benefit the college, but could not otherwise be funded officially.

Current activities

Contributions from individuals and corporate members provide the Foundation's funding, supplemented by grants from other foundations and organizations. The Foundation uses its funds to enrich and to further enhance the Naval War College's educational programs. Among its current primary activities are:

 Enhancing public awareness of the Naval War College's purpose, activities, and achievements.
 Supporting the Naval War College Distinguished Graduate Leadership Award.
 Publishing a newsletter for members, The Bridge
 Providing financial support activities at the college for which government funds are not available, including support for faculty research, curriculum development, endowing academic chairs, speakers for the public lecture series, funding academic awards, and providing document and artifact acquisition for the college library and the Naval War College Museum.
 Providing support for symposia and conferences, including the annual Professional Ethics Conference, the annual Current Strategy Forum as well as present and future worldwide security conferences and workshops on topical issues.
 Assisting the Naval War College to maintain an active alumni program.
 Operating a Store in the Naval War College Museum.
 Funding the Hattendorf Prize for Distinguished Original Research in Maritime History

References

External links
 Naval War College Foundation website 

Educational foundations in the United States
Non-profit organizations based in Rhode Island
Organizations established in 1969
1969 establishments in Rhode Island
Naval War College
United States Navy support organizations